Linda Lee Kelly (born May 20, 1949) is an American attorney. In 2011, she was appointed Attorney General of Pennsylvania. Kelly served in the position until Kathleen Kane, her elected successor, took office in 2013.

Education
Kelly is a graduate of Elizabeth Forward High School, the University of Pittsburgh and the Duquesne University School of Law.

Legal career
Kelly was an assistant district attorney in Allegheny County; she also served twice as an acting U.S. Attorney, in 1997-98 and again in 2001. She was nominated by Governor Tom Corbett to be his permanent successor as Attorney General of Pennsylvania in February 2011, and was unanimously confirmed by the Pennsylvania Senate on May 23, 2011. Kelly was the first woman to serve as state attorney general since Anne Alpern left office in 1961.

Personal life
Kelly and her husband Paul have one daughter, Kate.

See also
List of female state attorneys general in the United States

References

External links

1949 births
Living people
Pennsylvania Republicans
University of Pittsburgh alumni
Pennsylvania Attorneys General
Lawyers from Pittsburgh
United States Attorneys for the Western District of Pennsylvania